Victorino Matus is an American journalist who is a deputy editor for The Washington Free Beacon and was formerly a senior editor and assistant managing editor for The Weekly Standard.

Biography
Matus graduated from Georgetown University.

He worked for a defense consulting firm and at the White House Writers Group. He joined The Weekly Standard in 1996. His work has also appeared in Policy Review, National Review, The Wall Street Journal, and The Washington Post, Renaissance Magazine  He is one of three writers at the Galley Slaves blog, with fellow Weekly Standard staffers Jonathan V. Last and David Skinner. He maintains a personal website as well.

References

External links
 

American male journalists
Living people
Georgetown University alumni
Year of birth missing (living people)
The Weekly Standard people
National Review people